Daniel Stewart (born 30 October 1988) is a former Australian rules football player for the Port Adelaide Football Club in the Australian Football League (AFL).

Stewart played junior representative football for the Eastern Ranges before moving to AFL Queensland (AFLQ) side Labrador and then to North Adelaide Football Club in the South Australian Football League (SANFL) in 2008. He was drafted by Port Adelaide in the 2009 Rookie draft with the 35th selection and spent the 2009 season playing for North Adelaide before his promotion to Port's senior list at the end of the 2009 season.

After performing well in the 2010 NAB Cup, Stewart made his AFL debut in Round 4 of the 2010 AFL season. Stewart played in 11 games in 2010 and kicking 12 goals in total, which included a career best of 4 goals in the Power's round 22 match against Richmond.

Stewart was delisted from the Power at the end of the 2013 season after making only one appearance for the year.

References

External links

1988 births
Living people
Australian rules footballers from Victoria (Australia)
North Adelaide Football Club players
Port Adelaide Football Club players
Port Adelaide Football Club players (all competitions)
Labrador Australian Football Club players